Tea Importation Act of 1897 was a United States public law forbidding the import of tea into the United States with excessive levels of fluoride, heavy metals, oxalate, and pesticides. The Act of Congress established a uniform standard of purity and quality while attempting to achieve the optimal health effects of tea and phenolic content in tea.  The statute declared it unlawful to import into the United States "any merchandise as tea which is inferior in purity, quality, and fitness for consumption to the standards kept at customhouses..."  For nearly a century, Congress provided that no imported tea could enter the United States unless federal tea-tasters decided that it measured up to preselected standard samples.  The law restricted the International trade of camellia sinensis.

The 1897 statute superseded the Spurious Tea Importation Act of 1883.

The act was on the books for 99 years before its repeal in 1996.  After repeal, the Food and Drug Administration still regulates the quality of tea imported to the United States under the Federal Food, Drug, and Cosmetic Act of 1938.

Provisions of the Act
The United States statute had twelve sections and authorized the United States Secretary of the Treasury to implement the law. 

As codified just before its repeal, the Act instructed the Secretary of Health and Human Services each year "to appoint a board, to consist of seven members, each of whom shall be an expert in teas, and who shall prepare and submit to him standard samples of tea."  In accordance with the board of experts' recommendations, the Secretary was instructed to "fix and establish uniform standards of purity, quality, and fitness for consumption of all kinds of teas imported unto the United States" and to deposit samples of these standards in the customhouses of various ports of entry.  Tea importers were required to submit samples of their product for comparison with the standard samples kept at the customhouses. The imported samples were then tested "by a duly qualified examiner,"  who would test "the purity, quality, and fitness for consumption of the... [imported tea samples] according to the usages and customs of the tea trade, including the testing of an infusion of the same in boiling water and, if necessary, chemical analysis."

Board of Tea Appeals
The Board of Tea Appeals was a United States federal agency under the jurisdiction of the Food and Drug Administration. From its establishment in 1897 until its abolishment in 1996, it adjudicated the claims of tea importers whose products were denied entry into the United States by federal tea-tasters.  The Board was authorized to permit delivery or order destruction or exportation of substandard teas.

Amendment and Repeal of 1897 Act
The Tea Importation Act of 1908 amended the 1897 public law permitting the import of tea siftings, tea sweepings, or tea waste for the extraction of caffeine or theine, and other chemical products. The 1897 Act was repealed with the United States 104th Congressional session enactment of the Federal Tea Tasters Repeal Act of 1996.

Sections of the act
The twelve sections of the original act:

21 U.S.C. § 1 ~ Prohibit the unlawful importation of substandard tea 
21 U.S.C. § 2 ~ Establishment of a board of experts on tea 
21 U.S.C. § 3 ~ Establishment of tea purity standards 
21 U.S.C. § 4 ~ Bonds of exporters, examination of imported tea, and importation at ports without examiners 
21 U.S.C. § 5 ~ Delivery permits, reexamination, retention of substandard tea 
21 U.S.C. § 6 ~ Referral of disputes to Board of Tea Appeals to permit delivery, order destruction, or exportation of substandard tea 
21 U.S.C. § 7 ~ Examiners and examination according to usage of trade 
21 U.S.C. § 8 ~ Reexaminations including findings by examiner and assistance of experts 
21 U.S.C. § 9 ~ Reimporting rejected tea and forfeitures for violation of provisions 
21 U.S.C. § 10 ~ Issuance of regulations 
21 U.S.C. § 11 ~ Tea on shipboard subject to former 1883 law 
21 U.S.C. § 12 ~ Repeal of 1883 Act

See also
 Great Tea Race of 1866
 List of tea diseases
 Tea blending and additives
 Tea leaf grading
 Tea tasting

References

Bibliography
 "A Brief History of Tea: The Rise and Fall of the Tea Importation Act" by Patricia JB DeWitt 
Federal Administrative Law by Gary Lawson

External links
 
 
 
 
 
 

1897 in law
1897 in American law
54th United States Congress
United States federal health legislation
Health policy in the United States
1897 in the United States
Food and Drug Administration
Tea industry